St Matthew's Church is a heritage listed Anglican church in Marryatville, an inner eastern suburb of Adelaide, South Australia. It was established in 1848 and consecrated in 1849. It is adjacent to Marryatville High School.

History
The land for the church was donated in 1848 by the South Australia Company, who received it from George Brunskill. The church was consecrated on 21 September 1849.

Percy Grainger's parents, architect John Harry Grainger and Rose Annie Aldridge, daughter of a local hotel-keeper, were married in St Matthew's in 1880, and Percy's funeral was conducted there after his body was flown back from the United States in 1961.

The church was listed on the now-defunct Register of the National Estate on 21 March 1978.

Grace Anglican Network
St Matthew's was as of 2021 part of the Grace Anglican Network, together with St Bartholomew's Church in Norwood (St Bart's Norwood). The network was created in 2002. The church communities described themselves as "gospel-centred" and evangelical in theological stance. , "St Bart's Norwood" makes no mention of St Matthew's on its website, but says it is transitioning to a new ministry team.

Rectors
Mathew Hale
Tim Harris
Kevin Giles, a well-known contributor to discussions about gender roles and the Trinity, including subordinationism.

Cemetery
Notable South Australians buried on the grounds of St Matthews include:
 Colonel Peter Edgerton Warburton, noted South Australian explorer and police commissioner, who died in 1889. His eldest daughter married the only son of Augustus Short, the first Anglican bishop of Adelaide.
 Baroness von Oertzen, born Matilda Goulding, 1 January 1840, in Marlborough, Wiltshire, died 27 April 1864, in South Australia, ancestor of Baron Klaus von Oertzen.

References

Further reading
 "St. Matthews Church, Kensington South Australia 1848–1988 : an historical record of our parish in celebration of Australia’s Bi-Centenary and for those who follow us", Editor: Kevin Giles.  Published 1988.

External links
 

Churches in Adelaide
Anglican churches in South Australia
1849 establishments in Australia
South Australian places listed on the defunct Register of the National Estate